Jonathan "JJ" Starling (born March 16, 2004) is an American college basketball player for Syracuse Orange of the Atlantic Coast Conference (ACC). He previously played for the Notre Dame Fighting Irish.

Early life and high school career
Starling grew up in Baldwinsville, New York and initially attended Charles W. Baker High School. As a sophomore, he averaged 28.6 points, 6.2 rebounds, and 1.8 assists per game and set the school's scoring record during his sophomore season. Following the end of the school year, Starling transferred to La Lumiere School in La Porte, Indiana. As a senior, Starling played in the Jordan Brand Classic and the McDonald's All-American Game.

Recruiting
Starling was a consensus five-star recruit and one of the top players in the 2022 class, according to major recruiting services. On October 12, 2021, he committed to playing college basketball for Notre Dame over offers from Duke, Northwestern, Stanford, and Syracuse. He was the highest-rated player to commit to Notre Dame since Demetrius Jackson in 2013.

College career
Starling enrolled at Notre Dame shortly after graduating high school and took part in the Fighting Irish's summer practices. He entered his freshman season as a potential first-round selection in the 2023 NBA draft. Starling averaged 11.2 points per game and was named the Atlantic Coast Conference (ACC) All-Freshman team. At the end of the season, he entered the NCAA transfer portal.

Starling committed to transfer to Syracuse.

References

External links
Notre Dame Fighting Irish bio
USA Basketball bio

2004 births
Living people
African-American basketball players
American men's basketball players
Basketball players from New York (state)
Notre Dame Fighting Irish men's basketball players
Shooting guards
McDonald's High School All-Americans